Chamara de Soysa (born 12 October 1978) is a Sri Lankan former cricketer. He played first-class cricket for several domestic teams in Sri Lanka between 1994 and 2012. He was also a part of Sri Lanka's squad for the 1998 Under-19 Cricket World Cup.

References

External links
 

1978 births
Living people
Sri Lankan cricketers
Bloomfield Cricket and Athletic Club cricketers
Burgher Recreation Club cricketers
Saracens Sports Club cricketers
Singha Sports Club cricketers
Cricketers from Galle